Enrico Geroni (born 18 June 1989) is an Italian footballer. He currently plays for Crema in Serie D.

Biography
Born in Florence, Tuscany, Geroni was a youth product of A.C. Prato. In 2006, he was signed by Lombard club AlbinoLeffe. Geroni made his senior debut for the club in a 2-2 draw with Grosseto on 4 October 2008.

On 29 July 2010, he signed a new five-year contract with club along with Alessandro Salvi and Manuel Daffara; all three youth products fulfill the criteria of having reached a certain number of professional appearances and eligible to sign a contract of maximum of five years instead of three years in protection period. Geroni and Paolo Maino were signed by Barletta on 11 January 2011.

In summer 2011 he was signed by Prato. On 8 July 2013 Geroni left AlbinoLeffe again for Carrarese. On 2 February 2016 he left the club again for Aversa Normanna in a definitive deal.

In December 2015 he was signed by Serie D club Olbia. The club was promoted to Lega Pro to fill the vacancies.

References

External links
 AIC profile (data by football.it) 
 

1989 births
Living people
Italian footballers
U.C. AlbinoLeffe players
A.S.D. Barletta 1922 players
A.C. Prato players
Carrarese Calcio players
S.F. Aversa Normanna players
Olbia Calcio 1905 players
Serie B players
Serie C players
Serie D players
Association football midfielders